Nelson Ferreira may refer to:

 Nelson Ferreira (footballer) (born 1982), Swiss and Portuguese footballer
 Nelson Ferreira (sound editor), sound editor
 Nélson Carlos Ferreira (born 1973), Brazilian long jump athlete
 Nelson Ferreira (painter) (born 1978), Portuguese visual artist